Opisthoteuthis japonica is a species of octopus that lives in the Pacific Ocean near Japan. Its mantle is about 45 millimeters long, and it's been found at 152 meters deep. O. japonica lives in the neritic zone.

References

Octopuses
Molluscs described in 1962